This is a list of drive-in theaters. A drive-in theater is a form of cinema structure consisting of a large outdoor movie screen, a projection booth, a concession stand, and a large parking area for automobiles. Within this enclosed area, customers can view films from their cars.

This list includes active and defunct drive-in theaters.

Drive-in theatres

Australia

About 330 drive-in theatres were established in Australia, following the Skyline, established in 1954 in Melbourne.

United States

The first drive-in was opened in 1933 in New Jersey.  As of 2017, around 330 drive-in theaters were operating in the United States, down from a peak of around 4,000 in the late 1950s.  At least six are listed on the National Register of Historic Places (NRHP). Notable U.S. examples include:

Gallery

See also

 Mobmov, mobile, drive-up movie theatre
 Drive-in theater Revival, for other guerrilla drive-in operations
 Inflatable movie screen

References

External links
 Driveinmovie.com
 

Drive-in theaters
Drive-In Theatres
Lists of theatres